Simione Kaitani is a former Fijian politician. He was previously a Cabinet Minister from 2001 to 2006, serving initially as Minister for Transport and Civil Aviation, and later as Information Minister.  He resigned these portfolios in favour of Ratu Naiqama Lalabalavu on 20 September 2005, but remained in the Cabinet as a Minister without portfolio. Following the general election of 2006, he was appointed Leader of the House, and as such was responsible for the conduct of government business in the House of Representatives.  He remained in this position until the military coup that overthrew the government on 5 December 2006.

Kaitani was first elected to the House of Representatives as an independent candidate to represent the Lomaiviti Fijian Communal constituency in the general election of 1999, and later joined the Christian Democratic Alliance (VLV).  The VLV disintegrated in the political realignment that followed the coup, but Kaitani joined the newly formed Soqosoqo Duavata ni Lewenivanua (SDL), and retained his seat in the election of 2001 as an SDL candidate.  He was subsequently appointed to the Cabinet.

Kaitani's treason trial, 2005 
On 15 August 2005, he had been acquitted of charges that he had been involved in the coup d'état which deposed elected government in May 2000.  Among other things, he was accused of taking an illegal oath of ministerial office on 20 May 2000, to join the so-called Taukei Cabinet of George Speight, the chief instigator of the coup.

Kaitani had appeared in court on 23 May along with four other defendants.  One pleaded guilty to the charges against him and apologised.  The others, including Kaitani, all pleaded not guilty.  The trial of all except Tanaburenisau began on 17 June.  A number of witnesses were summoned, among them the Parliamentary Secretary, Mary Chapman, and Senator Mitieli Bulanauca, who was given immunity to testify.

On 1 August, Kaitani's defence lawyers Iqbal Khan and Rabo Matebalavu called for the charges against Kaitani and his fellow-accused to be dismissed on the grounds that twelve state witnesses who testified, including New Zealand Police handwriting expert David Boot, had failed to conclusively link the accused to their alleged crime. Kaitani said that of the ten thousand people who had gathered in the parliamentary complex when the crisis was at its height, not one had seen him taking an oath or signing any documents.  He questioned why the three alleged witnesses, including former Vice-President Ratu Jope Seniloli, had not been called to give evidence against him.  Judge Anthony Gates dismissed the application on 9 August, however, ordering the trial to continue.

Also on 9 August, Kaitani filed an unsworn statement in court that he had deliberately remained in the parliamentary complex during the upheaval, not to support the rebels, but to use his skills as a qualified conflict management trainer to calm the situation.  "In my professional capacity, I simply could not leave the parliamentary complex and watch it being taken over," he said.  "I decided to take the bull by the horn and remain there."  He continued to deny having taken an oath or signing an oath.  "I did not take an oath of allegiance or sign any documents," he declared, adding that the first he knew of his alleged unconstitutional ministerial appointment was from a newspaper.

In her summing up, however, state prosecutor Ashishna Prasad said that in the course of several police interviews, neither Kaitani nor his fellow accused had denied their involvement in the swearing-in ceremony on 20 May 2000.  All of them, she said, had been seen to have spent two minutes in a room with Seniloli, who had been appointed President by Speight, after which they gave one another congratulatory handshakes when they left.  She rejected Kaitani's defence that he "shook hands with everyone he meets to express the love and affection of God", saying it was a clear indication that he had sworn a ministerial oath.  She quoted Kaitani as having told the police, "Yes, it looks like mine" when shown the oath form.  She further alleged that Kaitani had insisted on having his name correctly typed on the form where that of Ratu Kinijoji Maivalili, who had declined appointment to the Primary Industries portfolio, had been crossed out.

On 12 August 2005, five court assessors unanimously reached a "not guilty" verdict concerning Kaitani and his co-accused.  The decision was not binding on Judge Anthony Gates, but he ratified their verdict on 15 August, saying that those who had testified had failed to prove beyond reasonable doubt that Kaitani and his associates were guilty of the charges specified.

New Cabinet posting 
On 20 September 2005, Prime Minister Laisenia Qarase announced that Kaitani had been relieved of his Transport and Civil Aviation portfolio to make way for Ratu Naiqama Lalabalavu, the Tui Cakau (Paramount Chief of the Tovata Confederacy) and leader of the Conservative Alliance, following Lalabalavu's release from a prison sentence that he had served extramurally on coup-related charges.  Kaitani said it was an honour for the people of Lomaiviti to make way for a paramount chief.  He would remain in the Cabinet as a Minister without portfolio in the Prime Minister's office, Qarase said.

On 26 September, Opposition Leader Mahendra Chaudhry stated his intention to approach the Electoral Commission and the office of the Auditor-General to investigate Kaitani's new appointment.  He said that Kaitani's job description as a Minister without portfolio, "undertaking various responsibilities in the Office of the PM (Prime Minister) at the direction of the PM ... to include close liaison with all ministers and travelling throughout the country to inform the people of the Government's development activities and to get a feedback from them on community development needs," indicated that Kaitani's appointment was a government ploy to have a person receiving a Ministerial salary to perform party political work for the ruling SDL.  He called this an "abuse of office," and said it had become "a hallmark" of the Qarase government.  "I have decided to refer this matter to the Electoral Commission and the Office of the Auditor-General for further investigation and necessary action," Chaudhry said.

Other roles 
Kaitani was also President of the National Youth Forum and at a convention in Viseisei Village in Ba Province on 14 December 2005, he was reelected to another two-year term.  Ratu Ilaitia Vakalalabure, Cakaudrove youth president, was elected Vice-President.

References

Year of birth missing (living people)
Living people
I-Taukei Fijian members of the House of Representatives (Fiji)
People acquitted of treason
Soqosoqo Duavata ni Lewenivanua politicians
Christian Democratic Alliance (Fiji) politicians
Transport ministers of Fiji
Information ministers of Fiji
I-Taukei Fijian people
Politicians from Lomaiviti Province